Frattura is a frazione of Scanno, in the Province of L'Aquila in the Abruzzo, region of Italy.

Frazioni of the Province of L'Aquila
Scanno, Abruzzo